Nanguyalai Tarzi – was a high-ranking Afghan diplomat who was the Afghan Ambassador to Switzerland and Permanent Representative to the United Nations office and other international organisations in Geneva. Tarzi has been the Ambassador of Afghanistan to India, and before that he was Permanent Representative to United Nations at Geneva and Afghan Ambassador to Switzerland, Ambassador of Afghanistan to Pakistan and Director of the United Nations Information Centres (UNIC) in Tehran, Iran. From 1980s to 1990s, Tarzi was Permanent Observer of Organisation of Islamic Cooperation (OIC) to the United Nations, Geneva, Switzerland and United Nations, Vienna, Austria and Senior Political Adviser and Deputy Permanent Observer of OIC to the United Nations, New York, United States of America. In the 1970s, Tarzi was the Afghan Diplomat in Washington D.C., United States of America.

1960–70: Education and academic life
Tarzi was born in Kabul, Afghanistan, son of the late Mohammad Seddiq Tarzi. Tarzi is member of the prominent Afghan Tarzi family and is mentioned as notable member on the website of the Tarzi Family Historical Society.

Tarzi began his education at the Lycée Esteqlal school in Kabul. He graduated from Kabul University with distinction degree in Law and Diplomatic Relations in 1964. He completed a doctorate in Sorbonne University in International Public Law at the Faculté de Droit et sciences économiques in Paris, France in 1970. His doctorate thesis: “Les Relation Afghano-Russes”. Avec mention “Trés bien”, was a candidate for the Best Thesis of 1970. Tarzi began his career as an assistant professor at the Faculty of Law and Political Science in Kabul University from December 1964 to June 1970.

Tarzi is proficient in Dari (Persian), Pashto, French and English and has a basic knowledge of Arabic.

1970–2002: Diplomat and international organizations
Tarzi's diplomatic career began in June 1970 by working for the Department of Information in the Ministry of Foreign Affairs in Kabul. From December 1973 until November 1977, Tarzi was Second Secretary of the Afghan Embassy in Washington D.C. to the United States of America. Then from December 1977 to November 1978, Tarzi was Deputy of Department of International Financial & Economic Relations, Ministry of Foreign Affairs, Kabul, Afghanistan.

In 1980, after the Communists had seized power in Afghanistan, Tarzi began working as International Civil Servant Diplomat for Organisation of Islamic Cooperation (OIC). From November 1979 until September 1986, Tarzi was the Senior Political Adviser at the Office of the Permanent Observer Mission of OIC to the United Nations, New York, United States of America. From November 1986 to November 1992, Tarzi was Ambassador, Deputy Permanent Observer of OIC to the United Nations, New York, United States of America.

In 1992, Tarzi established the first office of OIC in Geneva. From November 1992 to January 2000, Tarzi was Ambassador, Permanent Observer of OIC to the United Nations Office and other International Organisations in Geneva. Simultaneously, from August 1997 to January 2000, Tarzi was Ambassador, Permanent Observer of OIC to United Nations Industrial Development Organization (UNIDO), United Nations Office on Drugs and Crime (UNODC) and United Nations in Vienna, Austria.

In January 2001 to November 2002, Tarzi became Director of the United Nations Information Centres (UNIC) in Tehran, Iran.

2002–2015: Afghan Ambassador
In 2002, after the fall of the Taliban Regime in Afghanistan, Tarzi was appointed as Afghan Ambassador Extraordinary and Plenipotentiary to Pakistan, from February 2003 to December 2006. As Ambassador to Pakistan, Tarzi was member of a Tripartite Commission, composed of senior military and diplomatic representatives from Afghanistan, Pakistan and the United States of America.

From January 2007 to September 2010, Tarzi became Ambassador and Permanent Representative of the Islamic Republic of Afghanistan to the United Nations office and other International Organisations based in Geneva. Simultaneously, from June 2007 till September 2010, Tarzi was Ambassador of the Islamic Republic of Afghanistan to Switzerland.

From January 2011 to May 2013, Tarzi served as Ambassador Extraordinary and Plenipotentiary to India and Non-Resident Ambassador to Bhutan, Maldives, Nepal and Sri Lanka.

In June 2013 to October 2015, Tarzi became Ambassador and Permanent Representative of the Islamic Republic of Afghanistan to the United Nations office and other International Organisations and Ambassador of the Islamic Republic of Afghanistan to Switzerland in Geneva.

Diplomatic record

References

Academic staff of Kabul University
Afghan diplomats
Afghan expatriates in France
Afghan expatriates in Pakistan
Afghan expatriates in Switzerland
Pashtun people
Kabul University alumni
University of Paris alumni
Living people
Permanent Representatives of Afghanistan to the United Nations
Ambassadors of Afghanistan to Pakistan
Ambassadors of Afghanistan to India
Ambassadors of Afghanistan to Switzerland
Ambassadors of Afghanistan to Bhutan
Ambassadors of Afghanistan to the Maldives
Ambassadors of Afghanistan to Nepal
Ambassadors of Afghanistan to Sri Lanka
1949 births